NGC 1579 (also known as the Northern Trifid) is a diffuse nebula located in the constellation of Perseus.  It is referred to as the Northern Trifid because of its similar appearance to the Trifid Nebula, which is located in the southern celestial hemisphere of the sky.  It is a H II region, a region of star formation.

The star cluster contains the emission-line star LkHα 101, which provides much of the ionizing radiation in the nebula.

NGC 1579 lies within a giant molecular cloud known as the California Molecular Cloud.

Gallery

References

External links 
 

1579
Perseus (constellation)
Diffuse nebulae
H II regions
Star-forming regions